Maurice Adrian Alan Bartlett (born 9 June 1946) is a former Australian rules footballer who played with Melbourne in the Victorian Football League (VFL).  He also played with Prahran in the Victorian Football Association (VFA).

Notes

External links 

1946 births
Living people
Australian rules footballers from Victoria (Australia)		
Melbourne Football Club players